Tierra de Campos ("Land of Fields") is a large historical and natural region or greater comarca that straddles the provinces of León, Zamora, Valladolid and Palencia, in Castile and León, Spain. It is a vast, desolate plain with practically no relief, except for some wide undulations of the terrain.

Originally it was known as "Gothic Plains" (Campi Gothici or Campi Gothorum), as the area had been settled by Visigoths who fled from Aquitaine Gaul after its conquest by the Franks. It was first mentioned under this name in Codex Vigilanus (Codex Albeldensis), and described as extending "from the river Douro, to the Christian Kingdom".

Despite the strong identity of its inhabitants, this historical region has not been able to achieve the necessary legal recognition for its administrative development. Therefore, its municipalities have resorted to organizing themselves in a mancomunidad, the only legal formula that has allowed the region to manage its public municipal resources meaningfully. Palencia is widely considered to be the capital of the Tierra de Campos.

Geography

The ground is mostly made up of quite compact clay. The climate is continental with long, cold winters and short, hot summers. Rivers naturally irrigating the area are sparse and traditionally the land in Tierra de Campos has been used for dryland farming. The Channel of Castile, which cuts across this comarca, was developed for transport purposes but developed into an irrigation system. Some of the wetlands in Tierra de Campos, like the Laguna de la Nava de Fuentes and the Lagunas de Villafáfila, are important for the ecology of the region.
There are few natural forested areas left. The Tierra de Campos is the place with the highest concentration of bustard in the Iberian Peninsula, and possibly in the world.

There is no unanimous agreement regarding the precise boundaries of the Tierra de Campos. Since it is a natural and traditional region, no official limits have ever been assigned. One of the most widely accepted system of boundaries has been the following:
In the north: The foothills of the Cantabrian Mountains between Sahagún and Carrión de los Condes.
In the east: The Carrión and Pisuerga river basins.
In the south: The hills of Montes Torozos and the Sequillo river basin.
In the west: The Salinas de Villalpando and the Cea River further north.

Municipalities

León Province

Almanza
Bercianos del Real Camino
Calzada del Coto
Campazas
Castilfalé
Castrotierra de Valmadrigal
Cea
Cebanico
Cimanes de la Vega
Corbillos de los Oteros
Escobar de Campos
Fuentes de Carbajal
Fresno de la Vega
Gordaliza del Pino
Gordoncillo
Grajal de Campos
Gusendos de los Oteros
Izagre
Joara
Joarilla de las Matas
Matadeón de los Oteros
Matanza
Sahagún
Santa Cristina de Valmadrigal
Valdemora
Valderas
Vallecillo
Valverde-Enrique
Villamoratiel de las Matas
Villamartín de Don Sancho
Villabraz
Villamol
Villaselán
Villazanzo de Valderaduey

Zamora Province

 Belver de los Montes
 Cañizo
 Castroverde de Campos
 Cerecinos de Campos
 Cotanes del Monte
 Granja de Moreruela
 Manganeses de la Lampreana
 Prado
 Quintanilla del Monte
 Quintanilla del Olmo
 Revellinos
 San Agustín del Pozo
 San Cebrián de Castro
 San Esteban del Molar
 San Martín de Valderaduey
 Tapioles
 Vega de Villalobos
 Vidayanes
 Villafáfila
 Villalba de la Lampreana
 Villalobos
 Villalpando
 Villamayor de Campos
 Villanueva del Campo
 Villar de Fallaves
 Villárdiga
 Villarrín de Campos

Valladolid Province

 Aguilar de Campos
 Barcial de la Loma
 Becilla de Valderaduey
 Berrueces
 Bolaños de Campos
 Bustillo de Chaves
 Cabezón de Valderaduey
 Cabreros del Monte
 Castrobol
 Castroponce
 Ceinos de Campos
 Cuenca de Campos
 Fontihoyuelo
 Gatón de Campos
 Herrín de Campos
 La Unión de Campos
 Mayorga
 Medina de Rioseco
 Melgar de Abajo
 Melgar de Arriba
 Monasterio de Vega
 Montealegre de Campos
 Moral de la Reina
 Morales de Campos
 Palazuelo de Vedija
 Pozuelo de la Orden
 Quintanilla del Molar
 Roales de Campos
 Saelices de Mayorga
 San Pedro de Latarce
 Santa Eufemia del Arroyo
 Santervás de Campos
 Tamariz de Campos
 Tordehumos
 Urones de Castroponce
 Urueña
 Valdenebro de los Valles
 Valdunquillo
 Valverde de Campos
 Vega de Ruiponce
 Villabaruz de Campos
 Villabrágima
 Villacarralón
 Villacid de Campos
 Villafrades de Campos
 Villafrechós
 Villagarcía de Campos
 Villagómez la Nueva
 Villalba de la Loma
 Villalán de Campos
 Villalón de Campos
 Villamuriel de Campos
 Villanueva de San Mancio
 Villanueva de la Condesa
 Villanueva de los Caballeros
 Villardefrades
 Villavellid
 Villavicencio de los Caballeros

Palencia Province

 Abarca de Campos
 Abia de las Torres
 Amayuelas de Arriba
 Ampudia
 Amusco
 Arconada
 Autilla del Pino
 Autillo de Campos
 Baquerín de Campos
 Bárcena de Campos
 Becerril de Campos
 Belmonte de Campos
 Boada de Campos
 Boadilla de Rioseco
 Boadilla del Camino
 Calzada de los Molinos
 Capillas
 Cardeñosa de Volpejera
 Carrión de los Condes
 Castil de Vela
 Castrillo de Villavega
 Castromocho
 Cervatos de la Cueza
 Cisneros, Palencia
 Espinosa de Villagonzalo
 Frechilla
 Frómista
 Fuentes de Nava
 Fuentes de Valdepero
 Grijota
 Guaza de Campos
 Husillos
 Itero de la Vega
 Lantadilla
 Loma de Ucieza
 Lomas de Campos
 Manquillos
 Marcilla de Campos
 Mazariegos
 Mazuecos de Valdeginate
 Meneses de Campos
 Monzón de Campos
 Moratinos
 Nogal de las Huertas
 Osornillo
 Osorno la Mayor
 Palencia
 Paredes de Nava
 Pedraza de Campos
 Perales
 Piña de Campos
 Población de Arroyo
 Población de Campos
 Pozo de Urama
 Requena de Campos
 Revenga de Campos
 Ribas de Campos
 Riberos de la Cueza
 San Cebrián de Campos
 San Mamés de Campos
 San Román de la Cuba
 Santa Cecilia del Alcor
 Santoyo
 Támara de Campos
 Torremormojón
 Valde-Ucieza
 Valle del Retortillo
 Villacidaler
 Villada
 Villaherreros
 Villalcázar de Sirga
 Villalcón
 Villalobón
 Villanueva del Campo
 Villamartín de Campos
 Villamoronta
 Villamuera de la Cueza
 Villanueva del Rebollar
 Villarmentero de Campos
 Villarramiel
 Villasarracino
 Villaturde
 Villaumbrales
 Villerías de Campos
 Villoldo
 Villovieco

Maps of Tierra de Campos areas in different provinces

See also
 Tierra del Pan
 Comarcas of Spain

References

External links

Tierra de Campos Rural Development Association
La provincia de León y sus comarcas; Cea-Campos
La provincia de León y sus comarcas; Esla-Campos
Laguna de Tamriz - Ecology
La Tierra de Campos y sus bases ecológicas en el siglo XVI

Comarcas of Castile and León
Comarcas of the Province of León
Mancomunidad
Historical regions in Spain
Natural regions of Spain